Andrew "Andy" Kirk (born 2 August 1982) is an English former professional rugby league footballer who played in the 2000s.

Background
Kirk was born in Leeds, West Yorkshire, England.

Playing career
Kirk joined Leeds Rhinos Academy in 1999, while at Leeds he represented Great Britain (Academy), and Yorkshire (Academy), he was Leeds  Alliance Player of the Year in 2000, he made his first-team debut in 2001's Super League VI at the Warrington Wolves in Daryl Powell's first game in charge, he went on to make eight appearances in total for the Leeds club. In 2003 he went on loan to the Salford City Reds, a move that was made permanent after Salford City Reds' successful National League One Grand Final winning season.

References

External links
Statistics at rugby.widnes.tv
Rhinos battle past Blue Sox
Super League preview
Rhinos romp to easy win
Reds rout the Bulldogs
Whitehaven hold Reds again
Salford take Arriva prize
Salford stay in front
Centurions bash Bulldogs
Reds march on
Reds rumble on
Hull KR shock Salford
Salford 20-27 Wakefield
Tigers edge closer to promotion
Super League XI
Widnes splash out on new recruits
Challenge Cup R4 round-up

1982 births
Living people
English rugby league players
Featherstone Rovers players
Halifax R.L.F.C. players
Leeds Rhinos players
Rugby league players from Leeds
Rugby league centres
Rugby league wingers
Salford Red Devils players
Wakefield Trinity players
Widnes Vikings players